North Green Street–Bouchelle Street Historic District is a national historic district located at Morganton, Burke County, North Carolina.  It encompasses 37 contributing buildings in a predominantly residential section of Morganton. It includes buildings built between about 1876 and 1935, and includes representative examples of Colonial Revival, Bungalow / American Craftsman, and Late Victorian style architecture.  Located in the district is the separately listed Alphonse Calhoun Avery House.

It was listed on the National Register of Historic Places in 1987.

References

Houses on the National Register of Historic Places in North Carolina
Historic districts on the National Register of Historic Places in North Carolina
Colonial Revival architecture in North Carolina
Victorian architecture in North Carolina
Historic districts in Burke County, North Carolina
National Register of Historic Places in Burke County, North Carolina
Houses in Burke County, North Carolina